Phantasmagoria is the third studio album by Curved Air. Released in 1972, it reached No. 20 in the UK Charts and is notable for its early use of the EMS Synthi 100 synthesizer to process lead singer Sonja Kristina's voice on the second side. Unavailable for many years, the album was reissued on CD in April 2007.

Reception

Allmusic called Phantasmagoria "the culmination of all that Curved Air promised over the course of its predecessors" and "the band's grandest hour by far". Their review praised the vast majority of the individual tracks, especially complimenting the blending of musical styles and absence of pretentiousness.

Track listing
Side One
"Marie Antoinette" (Darryl Way, Sonja Kristina Linwood) – 6:20
"Melinda (More or Less)" (Linwood) – 3:25
"Not Quite the Same" (Way, Linwood) – 3:44
"Cheetah" (Way) – 3:33
"Ultra-Vivaldi" (Way, Francis Monkman) – 1:22

Side Two
"Phantasmagoria" (Monkman) – 3:15
"Whose Shoulder Are You Looking Over Anyway?"(Monkman) – 3:24
"Over and Above" (Monkman) – 8:36
"Once a Ghost, Always a Ghost" (Monkman, Linwood) – 4:25

 Note: "Ultra-Vivaldi is incorrectly listed as being 2:22 on the label of initial green label pressings.

One other track was recorded and released as a single, with "Phantasmagoria" on the b-side:
"Sarah's Concern" (Way, Linwood) - 3:20

Personnel
Curved Air
 Sonja Kristina – lead vocals, acoustic guitar (2)
 Darryl Way – violin, keyboards (1, 3), tubular bells (1), melon (1)
 Francis Monkman – keyboards, electric guitar, percussion (8, 9)
 Mike Wedgwood – bass, backing vocals, acoustic (6) and electric (9) guitar, percussion (9)
 Florian Pilkington-Miksa – drums, percussion (9)
Guest musicians
 Annie Stewart – flute (2)
 Crispian Steele-Perkins – trumpet
 Paul Cosh – trumpet
 James Watson – trumpet
 George Parnaby – trumpet
 Chris Pyne – trombone
 Alan Gout – trombone
 David Purser – trombone
 Steve Saunders – trombone
 Frank Ricotti – xylophone, vibes
 Mal Linwood-Ross – percussion
 Colin Caldwell – percussion
 Jean Akers – percussion
 Doris the Cheetah — vocals (4)
Technical
Richard Rockwood - art direction
John Gorham - cover illustration

References

External links 
 Track Descriptions
 Phantasmagoria review
 Phantasmagoria review

3
1972 albums
Warner Records albums